Music in Darkness, known in the United States as Night Is My Future, is a 1948 Swedish drama film directed by Ingmar Bergman.

The screenplay was written by Bergman and Dagmar Edqvist, whose novel, Music In Darkness, is the basis of the film. The theme of blindness and of a blind's person subjective experience plays a major role in the psychological study depicted in the movie. Bergman was deeply passionate about music and once said, "If I had to choose between losing my eyes or ears—I would keep my ears. I can't imagine anything more terrible than to have my music taken away from me."

Plot
Talented pianist Bengt Vyldeke loses his sight after being accidentally shot during a military exercise. Bengt is gripped by increasing bitterness and develops a relationship with Ingrid, a lower-class girl employed as a servant in the home of Bengt's parents.

Cast

 Mai Zetterling as Ingrid
 Birger Malmsten as Bengt Vyldeke
 Rune Andréasson as Evert
 Ulla Andreasson as Sylvia
 Gunnar Björnstrand as Klasson
 Hilda Borgström as Lovisa
 Britta Brunius as A woman
 Åke Claesson as Augustin Schröder
 Bengt Eklund as Ebbe
 John Elfström as Otto Klemens
 Barbro Flodquist as Hjördis
 Mona Geijer-Falkner as Woman at the garbage can
 Marianne Gyllenhammar as Blanche
 Douglas Håge as Kruge
 Svea Holst as Post office worker
 Stig Johanson as A man
 Sven Lindberg as Hedström
 Arne Lindblad as The Chef
 Bengt Logardt as Einar Born
 Segol Mann as Anton Nord
 Georg Skarstedt as Joensson
 Bibi Skoglund as Agneta
 Reinhold Svensson as Man in bar
 Naima Wifstrand as Mrs. Schroeder
 Olof Winnerstrand as The Vicar

References

External links

1948 films
1948 drama films
1940s Swedish-language films
Films directed by Ingmar Bergman
Swedish black-and-white films
Swedish drama films
1940s Swedish films